George Hannigan (born 16 September 1987) is an Irish Gaelic football player who plays at inter-county level for Tipperary, and plays his club football for Shannon Rovers.

Career
Hannigan made his championship debut for Tipperary in 2006 against Kerry 	
On 31 July 2016, he started in midfield as Tipperary defeated Galway in the 2016 All-Ireland Quarter-finals at Croke Park to reach their first All-Ireland semi-final since 1935.
On 21 August 2016, Tipperary were beaten in the semi-final by Mayo on a 2-13 to 0-14 scoreline.

On 24 October 2018, Hannigan announced his retirement from inter-county football.

Honours
Tipperary
 National Football League Division 3 (2): 2009, 2017
 National Football League Division 4 (1): 2014

References

External links
Tipperary GAA Profile

1987 births
Living people
Tipperary inter-county Gaelic footballers